Larks form the family Alaudidae. The International Ornithological Committee (IOC) recognizes these 100 species of larks distributed among 31 genera. 

This list is presented according to the IOC taxonomic sequence and can also be sorted alphabetically by common name and binomial.

References

L